was a Japanese homoerotic fetish artist. Tatsuji, along with Go Mishima, Sanshi Funayama, and Go Hirano, is regarded by artist and historian Gengoroh Tagame as a central figure in the first wave of contemporary gay artists in Japan.

Biography
Okawa lived in the Kanto region, where in his private life he had a wife, children, and white-collar job, and would rent hotel rooms in Shinjuku to draw. He would later be published in the magazine Barazoku.

Okawa quit illustration in the 1970s, and gave his artist materials to Mamiya Hiroshi, an editor at Fuzokukitan. Upon his death in 1994, his works were acquired by Hiroshi and Bungaku Itō, the founding editor of Barazoku.

The writer Yukio Mishima was a fan of Okawa's, and reportedly commissioned Okawa to draw a portrait of Mishima being tortured.

See also
 Homosexuality in Japan

References

1904 births
1994 deaths
20th-century Japanese painters
Fetish artists
Gay painters
Gay male BDSM
Japanese erotic artists
Japanese gay artists
Japanese LGBT painters
20th-century Japanese LGBT people